Robiquetia cerina is a species of orchid endemic to the Philippines.

cerina
Orchids of the Philippines